David "Dave" Buckley is a professional rugby league footballer who has played in the 2000s, He has played at representative level for Ireland, and at club level for York City Knights, as a , or .

International honours
Dave Buckley won a cap for Ireland while at York City Knights 2007 1-cap.

References

Ireland national rugby league team players
Living people
Place of birth missing (living people)
Rugby league props
Rugby league second-rows
Year of birth missing (living people)
York City Knights players